Gliese 412 is a pair of stars that share a common proper motion through space and are thought to form a binary star system. The pair have an angular separation of 31.4″ at a position angle of 126.1°. They are located 15.8 light-years distant from the Sun in the constellation Ursa Major. Both components are relatively dim red dwarf stars.

The two stellar components of this system have a projected separation of about 152 AU, and an estimated orbital semimajor axis of 190 AU. The primary has about 48% of the Sun's mass, while the secondary is only 10%. The primary has a projected rotation velocity at the equator of less than 3 km/s; the secondary has a rotation velocity of  km/s.

The primary star was monitored for radial velocity (RV) variations caused by a Jupiter-mass companion in a short-period orbit. It displayed no significant excess of RV variation that could be attributed to a planet. A search of the system using near-infrared speckle interferometry also failed to detect a companion orbiting at distances of 1–10 AU. Nor has a brown dwarf been detected orbiting within this system.

The space velocity components of this system are U = 141, V = –7 and W = 7. They are members of the halo population of the Milky Way galaxy.

X-ray source

The secondary is a flare star that is referred to as WX Ursae Majoris. It is characterized as a UV Ceti-type variable star that displays infrequent increases in luminosity. This star was observed to flare as early as 1939 by the Dutch astronomer Adriaan van Maanen.

Component B (WX Ursae Majoris) has been identified as an X-ray source, while no significant X-ray emission was detected from component A. This system had not been studied in X-rays prior to ROSAT. The Gaia DR2 release gives a parallax of 204.059 ±0.169 mas for B, indicating a distance of around 16 light-years.

References

See also
 List of nearest stars
 X-ray astronomy

Binary stars
054211
0412
BD+44 2051
Local Bubble
Ursa Major (constellation)
M-type main-sequence stars
Flare stars
Astronomical X-ray sources
Ursae Majoris, WX